The primary languages of Calabria are the Italian language as well as regional varieties of the Neapolitan and Sicilian, all collectively known as Calabrian. In addition, there are 100,000 speakers of the Arbëresh variety of Albanian, as well as small numbers of Calabrian Greek speakers and pockets of Occitan.

Calabrian (Calabrese)

Calabrian refers to the Romance varieties spoken in Calabria, Italy. The varieties of Calabria are part of a strong dialect continuum that are generally recognizable as Calabrian, but that are usually divided into two different language groups:

In the southern two-thirds of the region, the Calabrian dialects are more closely related to Sicilian, grouped as Central-Southern Calabrian, or simply Calabro, and are usually classified as part of Extreme Southern Italian (Italiano meridionale-estremo) language group
In the northern one-third of the region, the Calabrian dialects are often classified typologically with Neapolitan language and are called Northern Calabrian or just Cosentian.

The Amantea-Cirò line is generally considered an approximate demarcation between the Neapolitan and Extreme Southern Italian groups.

The linguistic division roughly corresponds with the historic administrative division already in place since medieval times: Calabria Citeriore (or Latin Calabria) and Calabria Ulteriore (or Greek Calabria). This is a broad generalization and many communities in the more central parts of the region exhibit features of both language groups.

The dialects of Calabria have been extensively studied, catalogued and commented upon by German philologist Gerhard Rohlfs. From the mid-1920s to the mid-1970s, he traveled the region extensively and assembled a very extensive, multi-volume dictionary.

Central-Southern Calabrian

The areas where Central–Southern Calabrian (calabbrìsi or calavrìsi, in Sicilian) is spoken corresponds generally to the provinces of Reggio Calabria, Vibo Valentia, Catanzaro, the southern part of Crotone (Crotone, Isola di Capo Rizzuto, Cutro and vicinity) and southern Cilento. The term Sicilian-Calabrian is also used to distinguish the group from the Northern Calabrian group. It comprises Central Calabrian and Southern Calabrian.
 
The primary roots of the dialects is Latin. Southern and Central Calabrian dialects are strongly influenced by a Greek substratum and ensuing levels of Latin influence and other external Southern Italian superstrata, in part hindered by geography, resulted in the many local variations found between the idioms of Calabria. Nonetheless, the dialects have some influence from other languages, thanks to the periodic rule and influx of other cultures. As a result, French, Occitan and Spanish have left an imprint.

French and Norman vocabulary entered the region via the kingdoms of the Normans and the Angevins in Calabria.

Other words derived from Spanish, Catalan, and Occitan:
capezza – cabeza (Spanish) – head
cucchiàra – cuchara (Spanish) – spoon
palumba – paloma (Spanish) – dove
scupetta – escopeta (Spanish) – rifle
muccatùri – mocador (Catalan) – tissue
prèscia – pressa (Catalan) – precipitation
timpa – timba (Catalan) – abrupt
addhumàri – allumar (Occitan, French, Provençal) – light up
truppicari – trompicar (Spanish) – trip

Conjugations

Êssiri (to be)

Aìri (to have)

Dialects
Reggino dialect ("u 'rriggitànu" in Reggino): the dialect with the most speakers, and cites Reggio Calabria as its cultural centre. This dialect is very similar to the dialect of Messina in Sicily.
Dialects of the Chjàna: spoken in the plains of Gioia Tauro (Piana di Gioia Tauro), a micro-region situated north of Aspromonte.
Locride dialects: spoken on the east coast of the Province of Reggio Calabria.
Catanzaro dialect.
Dialects of the Alto-Jonica: used in the area of the Gulf of Squillace, similar to the dialect spoken in Catanzaro.

Comparison of the Central-Southern Calabrian Dialects
Universal Declaration of Human Rights in English:
All human beings are born free and equal in dignity and rights. They are endowed with reason and conscience and should act towards one another in a spirit of brotherhood.
In Italian:
Tutti gli esseri umani nascono liberi ed eguali in dignità e diritti. Essi sono dotati di ragione e di coscienza e devono agire gli uni verso gli altri in spirito di fratellanza.

Northern Calabrian (Cosentian)

The Northern Calabrian dialects are largely found in the Province of Cosenza and are similar to the Neapolitan language. The northern fringes are an area of transitional dialects which give way to Campanian and Lucanian dialects.

The map shows the Cosentian dialects (Ve) and transitional dialects (Vd) occurring in Cosenza province.

Conjugations

Êsse (to be)

Avì (to have)

Comparison of Central-Southern and Northern Calabrian
Universal Declaration of Human Rights in English:
All human beings are born free and equal in dignity and rights. They are endowed with reason and conscience and should act towards one another in a spirit of brotherhood.
In Italian:
Tutti gli esseri umani nascono liberi ed eguali in dignità e diritti. Essi sono dotati di ragione e di coscienza e devono agire gli uni verso gli altri in spirito di fratellanza.
 In Reggino (Central-Southern Calabrian) and Cosentian (Northern Calabrian):

Bibliography
Gerhard Rohlfs, Nuovo Dizionario Dialettale della Calabria, Longo, Ravenna, 1990;
Gerhard Rohlfs, Dizionario dei Cognomi e Soprannomi in Calabria, Longo, Ravenna, 1979;
Gerhard Rohlfs, Dizionario toponomastico ed Onomastico della Calabria, Longo, Ravenna, 1990;
Giuseppe Pensabene, Cognomi e Toponimi in Calabria, Gangemi, Reggio Calabria, 1987;
G. Amiotti – M. Vittoria Antico Gallina – L. Giardino, I Greci nel sud dell'Italia, Amilcare Pizzi, Milan, 1995;
Domenico Caruso, Storia e Folklore Calabrese, Centro Studi S. Martino, 1988;

Other languages in Calabria
 Calabrian Greek, a variety of Greek spoken in Calabria. Native Italian Greek varieties are classified as the Griko dialect of modern Greek.
 Gardiol, a variety of Occitan spoken in Guardia Piemontese.
 Arbëresh, a dialect of the Albanian language.

Bibliography 
Italian bibliography:
 Autori Vari, Storia e Civiltà dei Greci, Bompiani, IV edizione 2000;
 Autori Vari, Storia della Calabria, Gangemi, Reggio Calabria, 1988/1999.
 Luigi Accattatis, Vocabolario del dialetto calabrese: opera in 3 volumi, Casa del libro, 1963;
Alessio, G. 1931-2, Rec. a G. Rohlfs, Etymologisches Wörterbuch der unteritalienischen Gräzität, «Archivio Storico per la Calabria e Lucania», I-II, 1-56; 261–273. 
Alessio, G. 1934. Il sostrato Latino nel lessico e nell'epotoponomastica dell'Italia meridionale, in «L’Italia Dialettale» X 1934, 111–190. Alessio, G. 1936. Note etimologiche, «L’Italia Dialettale» XII, 59–81. 
Alessio, G. 1936a, Ricerche etimologiche, «AGI» XXVIII, 151–171. Alessio, G. 1937. Ricerche etimologiche (continuazione), «AGI» XXIX, 120–137. 
Alessio, G. 1937–8. Deformazione ed etimologia popolare nei dialetti dell'Italia meridionale, «Rendiconti dell'Istituto Lombardo di Scienze e Lettere. Classe di Lettere e scienze morali e storiche» 71, 357–407. 
Alessio, G. 1938 sgg. Nuovo contributo al problema della grecità nell'Italia meridionale, «RIL» LXII, 109–137; 137–172; LXXIV, 1940–1, 631–706, LXXVII, 1943–44, 617–706; LXXIV, 1940–1, 631–706; LXXVII, 1943–4, 617–706; 137–172; LXXIX, 1945–46, 65–92. 
Alessio, G. 1939a. Gli imprestiti dal Latino nei relitti bizantini dei dialetti dell'Italia meridionale, in Atti del V Congr. int. di studi bizantini, I, Roma («Studi bizantini e neoellenici» V, 1939), 341–90. 
Alessio, G. 1940 sgg. Nuovi grecismi nei dialetti del Mezzogiorno d’Italia, «RFIC» 68, 256–263; 70, 1942, 47–53. 
Alessio, G. 1941. Due problemi etimologici italiani meridionali, «AR» 25, 201–206. 
Alessio  G. 1942. Americanismi in Calabria, "Lingua Nostra" IV 1942, 41. 
Alessio, G. 1942 a. Ricerche etimologiche (continuazione), "AGI" XXXIV, 23–35. 
Alessio, G. 1942–3. L'elemento Latino e quello greco nei dialetti del Cilento, "RIL" LXXVI, 341–360.
Alessio, G. 1942-3 a. Problemi di etimologia romanza, "RIL" LXXVI, 161-172 (Parte I); 173-187 (Parte II).
Alessio, G. 1943–4. Nuove indagini sulla grecità dell'Italia meridionale, "RIL" 77, 27-106. 
Alessio, G. 1946–7. Sulla latinità della Sicilia, "Atti della Accademia di Scienze, Lettere e Arti di Palermo" S. IV, vol. VII (Parte seconda: Lettere), anno acc. 1946–7, Palermo, 287–510. 
Alessio, G. 1948. Sulla latinità della Sicilia, "Atti della Accademia di Scienze, Lettere e Arti di Palermo" S. IV, vol. VIII (1947-8), 1–309. 
Alessio, G. 1953. Calchi linguistici greco-latini nell'antico territorio della Magna Grecia, Atti dell'VIII Congresso intern. di studi bizantini (Palermo 3-10 aprile 1951), 237–299. Roma. 
Alessio, G. 1954. La stratificazione linguistica nel Bruzio, in Atti del I Congresso Storico Calabrese (Cosenza, 15-19 settembre 1954), Roma, 305–355. 
Alessio, G. 1954a, Concordanze lessicali tra i dialetti rumeni e quelli calabresi, "Annali della Fac. di Lett. e Fil. di Bari" I, 3-53. 
Alessio, G. 1956. La Calabria preistorica e storica alla luce dei suoi aspetti linguistici, Napoli, pp. 96. 
Alessio, G. 1958. Miscellanea di etimologie romanze, in Omagiu ... Iordan, 5-14. 
Alessio, G. 1959. Nuove etimologie latine e romanze, in Raccolta di studi linguistici in onore di G. D. Serra, Napoli, 53-104. 
 G. Amiotti – M. Vittoria Antico Gallina – L. Giardino, I Greci nel sud dell'Italia (Collana: I popoli dell'Italia Antica), Amilcare Pizzi, Milan, 1995;
 P. A. Carè, Vocabolario dei Dialetti del Poro, Lambda, Nicotera (VV), 2000;
Falcone, G. 1969. Indagini esplorative e delimitazioni areali nella Calabria reggina, «Bollettino della Carta dei Dialetti Italiani» 4, 1-9 + due cartine. 
Falcone, G. 1971. Ricerche fonetiche e socio-linguistiche in Calabria, «Studi Linguistici Salentini» 4, 7-19. Falcone, G. 1971a. Ricerche romaiche e romanze in Calabria, «Studi Linguistici Salentini» 4, 53–98. 
Falcone, G. 1971b. I risultati delle nuove ricerche romaiche in Calabria e la teoria parlangeliana. «Studi Linguistici Salentini», 5, 111–123; 
Falcone, G. 1973. Lingua e dialetto nella Calabria reggina, in Bilinguismo e diglossia in Italia (C.N.R. - Centro di studio per la dialettologia italiana, 1) Pisa, Pacini, 97-108. 
Falcone, G. 1974. Innovazione e conservazione nei dialetti calabresi, in Dal dialetto alla lingua. Atti del IX Convegno del C.S.D.I. (Lecce, 28 sett.-1 ott. 1972), Pisa, Pacini. 
Falcone, G. 1976. Calabria (CNR, Centro di Studio per la Dialettologia Italiana, 5. "Profilo dei dialetti italiani" a cura di M. Cortelazzo, 18), Pisa, Pacini. 
Falcone, G. 1976a. I riflessi antroponimici della Grecità bizantina e metabizantina nella Calabria reggina, in Italia nuova ed antica, vol. I, Galatina, Congedo ed., 301–318. 
Falcone, G. 1978–9. Extralinguismo e stratificazione del lessico calabrese, "Studi Linguistici Salentini" 10, 137–154. 
Falcone, G. 1979. Postille all'EWUG2 e all'NDDC, in Etimologia e lessico dialettale. Atti del XII Conv. per gli Studi Dialettali Italiani (Macerata, 10 13 aprile 1979), Pisa 1981, pp. 447–463. 
Falcone, G. 1979 a. Racconti popolari calabresi, Casa del libro, Reggio Calabria. Falcone, G. 1981. Postille all'EWUG2 e all'NDDC, in Etimologia e lessico dialettale. Atti del XII
 L. Galasso, Vocabolario Calabro-Italiano, Edizioni Proposte, Nicotera (VV), 1995.
 Gregorino cav. Capano, Vocabolario dialettale San Sostene-Davoli (CZ), edito dalla Sudgrafica di Davoli Marina (CZ), settembre 2007.
 Gregorino cav. Capano, Dizionario delle Cinque Calabrie + due, edito dalla Sudgrafica di Davoli Marina (CZ), novembre 2009.
Martino, P. 1978. Calabrese `ndrànghita, greco andragathía, in Opuscula I, vol. 8 della «Biblioteca di ricerche linguistiche e filologiche» dell'Istituto di Glottologia dell'Università di Roma, pp. 37–55. 
Martino, P. 1980. L'isola grecanica dell'Aspromonte. Aspetti sociolinguistici, in «Atti dell'XI Congr. intern. SLI», vol.I, pp. 305–341, Roma, Bulzoni. 
Martino, P. 1988. Per la storia della 'ndrànghita, vol. 25,1 del Dipartimento di Studi glottoantropologici dell'Università di Roma "La Sapienza" (Opuscula III,1), Roma. 
Martino, P. 1990. 'Ndrànghita, in «Storia e Dossier» V, n. 41, giugno. 
Martino, P. 1990a. Due esiti di un grecismo bizantino in Calabria, in «L'Italia Dialettale. Rivista di dialettologia italiana», vol. LIII (Nuova Serie XXX). 
Martino, P. 1990b. Prefazione a G. Misitano, Vocabolario del dialetto di Sinopoli, Vibo Valentia, Qualecultura -Jaca Book, pp. 6–8. *Martino, P. 1991. L'"area Lausberg". Isolamento e arcaicità, vol. 31 della «Biblioteca di ricerche linguistiche e filologiche» del Dipartimento di Studi glottoantropologici dell'Università di Roma "La Sapienza", Roma, pp. 144 + 8 tavv. 
Martino, P. 1993. Riflessi lessicali di una concezione precristiana della morte, in Ethnos, lingua e cultura. Scritti in memoria di G. R. Cardona, 143–154. Roma, Il Calamo. Martino, P. 1994. Siciliano e calabrese (ac)cattïari ‘spiare, sbirciare’, in Miscellanea di studi linguistici in onore di Walter Belardi, vol. II, pp. 629–665, Roma, Il Calamo. 
Martino, P. 1997. Vicende di americanismi nei dialetti, in «Lingua Nostra» LVIII, fasc. 3–4, 109–110. 
Martino, P. 1999. Questioni di lessicologia calabrese: i conflitti omonimici, Atti del Convegno di Studi sul tema I dialetti dell'Italia centro-meridionale con particolare riferimento a quelli della Calabria (Cassano Jonio 25-27 ott. 1996), in «Linguistica Italiana Meridionale», IV-V, 1996–97, Bari, Laterza. 
Martino, P. 2001. Il lessico della Divina Commedia di G. Blasi. Nota linguistica, in La Divina Commedia di Dante Alighieri tradotta nel dialetto calabrese di Laureana (R.C.), a cura di Umberto Distilo, Cosenza, Pellegrini Ed., 627–782. 
Martino, P. 2002. Il dialetto di Melicuccà, in Melicuccà e i suoi poeti, a c. di V. Borgia, Villa S. Giovanni, Ed. Officina Grafica, 29–46. 
Martino, P. 2004. Sulla traduzione, Postfazione al Cantico dei cantici, Traduzione in dialetto calabrese di S. Augruso, Vibo Valentia, Qualecultura. 
Martino, P. 2008. Calabro-grecismi non bovesi, in I dialetti meridionali tra arcaismo e interferenza. Atti del Convegno Internazionale di Dialettologia (Messina, 4-6 giugno 2008), a cura di Alessandro De Angelis. Palermo, Centro di Studi Filologici e Linguistici Siciliani, pp. 63–84.
Martino, P. 2008a. L'affaire Bovesìa. Un singolare irredentismo, in Alloglossie e comunità alloglotte nell'Italia contemporanea, Atti del XLI Congresso Internazionale di Studi della Società di Linguistica Italiana (Pescara), in stampa. 
Martino, P. 1978. Calabrese `ndrànghita, greco andragathía, in Opuscula I, vol. 8 della "Biblioteca di ricerche linguistiche e filologiche" dell'Istituto di Glottologia dell'Università di Roma, pp. 37–55. 
 Giuseppe Antonio Martino, Dizionario dei dialetti della Calabria Meridionale, Qualecultura, Vibo Valentia 2010.
Martino, P. 1980. L'isola grecanica dell'Aspromonte. Aspetti sociolinguistici, in «Atti dell'XI Congr. intern. SLI», vol.I, pp. 305–341, Roma, Bulzoni. 
Martino, P. 1988. Per la storia della 'ndrànghita, vol. 25,1 del Dipartimento di Studi glottoantropologici dell'Università di Roma "La Sapienza" (Opuscula III,1), Roma. 
Martino, P. 1990. 'Ndrànghita, in «Storia e Dossier» V, n. 41, giugno. Martino, P. 1990a. Due esiti di un grecismo bizantino in Calabria, in «L'Italia Dialettale. Rivista di dialettologia italiana», vol. LIII (Nuova Serie XXX). 
Martino, P. 1990b. Prefazione a G. Misitano, Vocabolario del dialetto di Sinopoli, Vibo Valentia, Qualecultura -Jaca Book, pp. 6–8. *Martino, P. 1991. L'"area Lausberg". Isolamento e arcaicità, vol. 31 della «Biblioteca di ricerche linguistiche e filologiche» del Dipartimento di Studi glottoantropologici dell'Università di Roma "La Sapienza", Roma, pp. 144 + 8 tavv.
Martino, P. 1993. Riflessi lessicali di una concezione precristiana della morte, in Ethnos, lingua e cultura. Scritti in memoria di G. R. Cardona, 143–154. Roma, Il Calamo. 
Martino, P. 1994. Siciliano e calabrese (ac)cattïari ‘spiare, sbirciare’, in Miscellanea di studi linguistici in onore di Walter Belardi, vol. II, pp. 629–665, Roma, Il Calamo. 
Martino, P. 1997. Vicende di americanismi nei dialetti, in «Lingua Nostra» LVIII, fasc. 3–4, 109–110. 
Martino, P. 1999. Questioni di lessicologia calabrese: i conflitti omonimici, Atti del Convegno di Studi sul tema I dialetti dell'Italia centro-meridionale con particolare riferimento a quelli della Calabria (Cassano Jonio 25-27 ott. 1996), in «Linguistica Italiana Meridionale», IV-V, 1996–97, Bari, Laterza. 
Martino, P. 2001. Il lessico della Divina Commedia di G. Blasi. Nota linguistica, in La Divina Commedia di Dante Alighieri tradotta nel dialetto calabrese di Laureana (R.C.), a cura di Umberto Distilo, Cosenza, Pellegrini Ed., 627–782. 
Martino, P. 2002. Il dialetto di Melicuccà, in Melicuccà e i suoi poeti, a c. di V. Borgia, Villa S. Giovanni, Ed. Officina Grafica, 29–46. Martino, P. 2004. Sulla traduzione, Postfazione al Cantico dei cantici, Traduzione in dialetto calabrese di S. Augruso, Vibo Valentia, Qualecultura. 
Martino, P. 2008. Calabro-grecismi non bovesi, in I dialetti meridionali tra arcaismo e interferenza. Atti del Convegno Internazionale di Dialettologia (Messina, 4-6 giugno 2008), a cura di Alessandro De Angelis. Palermo, Centro di Studi Filologici e Linguistici Siciliani, pp. 63–84. 
Martino, P. 2008a. L'affaire Bovesìa. Un singolare irredentismo, in Alloglossie e comunità alloglotte nell'Italia contemporanea, Atti del XLI Congresso Internazionale di Studi della Società di Linguistica Italiana (Pescara), in stampa. Rohlfs, G. 1919–20. Span. judìa, kalabr. suraka 'Bohne', in "ZRPh" 40, p. 340. 
 F. Mosino, Dal Greco antico al Greco moderno in Calabria e Basilicata, G. Pontari, Reggio Calabria, 1995;
 Giuseppe Pensabene, Cognomi e Toponimi in Calabria, Gangemi, Reggio Calabria, 1987;
Rohlfs, G. 1922. Lat. ut 'wie' im heutigen Kalabrien, "ZRPh" 42, 210–211. Rohlfs, G. 1922 a, Apul. ku, kalabr. mu und der Verlust des Infinitivs in Unteritalien, "ZRPh" 42, 211–233.
Rohlfs, G. 1923. Zum Worte nasida, "Byzantinische-neugriechische Jahrbücher", 4, 17. Rohlfs, G. 1925 . Der Stand der Mundartenforschung in Unteritalien (bis zum Jahre 1923), in RLiR I, 278 323. Rohlfs, G. 1925 a. Dorische Sprachtrümmer in Unteritalien, "Byzantinische-neugriechische Jahrbücher", 4, 1–4. 
Rohlfs, G. 1926. Romani e Romaici nell'Italia meridionale, "AGI", XX, 72–96. Rohlfs, G. 1928. Autochtone Griechen oder byzantinische Gräzität?, "Revue de Linguistique Romane", IV, n. 13–14, 118-200 
Rohlfs, G. 1928a. La Grecía italica, "Anthropos", 23, 1021–1028. Rohlfs, G. 1930. Etymologisches Wörterbuch der unteritalienischen Gräzität (= EWUG), Halle; poi: Lexicon Graecanicum Italiae Inferioris (LGII), Tübingen 19642, pp. XXX-629. 
Rohlfs, G. 1932. La Grecità in Calabria, "Archivio Storico di Calabria e Lucania" II, 405–425. 
Rohlfs, G. 1934. A proposito di Vitreto, (Vitaritu), in "Archivio Storico di Calabria e Lucania" IV, 75–76. Rohlfs, G. 1958. La perdita dell'infinito nelle lingue balcaniche e nell'Italia meridionale, in Omagiu lui Jorgu Jordan, București: Editura Academei R. P. R., 733–744; poi in Rohlfs 1972, 318–332. 
Rohlfs, G. 1961. Su alcuni calchi sintattici dal greco nell'Italia meridionale, "Studi Linguistici Italiani", 2, 141-154 [Sull'uso del periodo ipotetico a Cardeto, Mélito, Ferruzzano, Platì e dintorni di Oppido e Palmi, ecc.] 
Rohlfs, G. 1964. Lexicon Graecanicum Italiae Inferioris. Etymologisches Wörterbuch der unteritalienischen Gräzität, 2., erweiterte und völlig neubearbeitete Auflage, Tübingen.
Rohlfs, G. 1965. La congiunzione mi (in sostituzione dell'infinito) in Sicilia, in Omagiu Alexandru Rosetti, Bucarest 1965, 775–778; poi in Rohlfs 1972, 1990, 333–338. 
Rohlfs, G. 1966, 1968, 1969. Grammatica storica della lingua italiana e dei suoi dialetti, 1. Fonetica, 2. Morfologia, 3. Sintassi e formazione delle parole, Torino (ed. it. di Historische Grammatik der italienischen Sprache und ihres Mundarten, Bern 1949). 
Rohlfs, G. 1969, Fra Sila e Aspromonte. Calabria dialettale, in Mélanges de philologie offerts à Alf Lombard (Etudes Romanes de Lund, XVIII), 178–190. Lund. 
Rohlfs, G. 1969a. Die Flussnamen im heutigen Kalabrien, "BNF" 4, Heft 2, 114–142. Rohlfs, G. 1972. Studi e ricerche su lingua e dialetti d'Italia, Firenze, Sansoni; rist. con pref. di F. Fanciullo, Firenze, Sansoni, 1990. 
Rohlfs, G. 1972a. Nuovi scavi linguistici nell'antica Magna Grecia, Palermo, Ist. di studi biz. e neoellenici, 1972; trad. it. di *Rohlfs 1962. [Rec. di M.G. Tibiletti Bruno in "Lingua e stile" X,1,1975, 134-7]. 
Rohlfs, G. 1974. Dizionario toponomastico e onomastico della Calabria. Prontuario filologico-geografico della Calabria, Ravenna, Longo [Rec. di M. Doria "Incontri Linguistici" 3/2, 1976–7, 199-209]. 
Rohlfs, G. 1977. Nuovo Dizionario Dialettale della Calabria (con repertorio calabro italiano). Nuova edizione interamente rielaborata, ampliata ed aggiornata. Ravenna, Longo. 
Rohlfs, G. 1977a. Grammatica storica dei dialetti italogreci (Calabria, Salento), München, Beck [Trad. ital. di Rohlfs 1950 a]. *Rohlfs, G. 1978. Calabria dialettale tra Monte Pollino e Aspromonte (Calabria Latina e Calabria grecanica), in «Forum Italicum» (Buffalo, N.Y.) 12, 3-10. 
Rohlfs, G. 1979. Dizionario dei cognomi e dei soprannomi in Calabria. Ravenna, Longo. Rohlfs, G. 1980. Calabria e Salento. Saggi di storia linguistica. Ravenna, Longo. 
Rohlfs, G. 1980a. Tipi del periodo ipotetico (condizionale) nell'estremo mezzogiorno d'Italia, in Stimmen der Romania. Festschrift Wilhelm Theodor Elwert zum 70. Geburtstag, a c. di G. Schmidt e M. Tietz, Wiesbaden, Heymann, 625–631. 
Rohlfs, G. 1982. Ein archaischer phonetischer Latinismus in nördlichen ('lateinischer') Kalabrien, in "ZRPh" 98, 547–549; poi (in trad. it.: Un arcaismo fonetico di antica latinità nel Bruzio) in Latinità ed ellenismo nel Mezzogiorno d'Italia. Studi e ricerche dalla Magna Grecia alla Grecia italiana, Framasud, Chiaravalle Centrale (Catanzaro) 1985, pp. 73 77. 
Rohlfs, G. 1984. Dizionario storico dei cognomi della Sicilia orientale (Centro di Studi Filologici e Linguistici Siciliani), Palermo. Rohlfs, G. 1984a. La Sicilia nei secoli, Palermo, Sellerio; rielaborazione di Historische Sprachschichten im modernen Sizilien, (1975).
 Gerhard Rohlfs, Nuovo Dizionario Dialettale della Calabria, Longo, Ravenna, 1990;
 Gerhard Rohlfs, Dizionario toponomastico ed Onomastico della Calabria, Longo, Ravenna, 1990;
 F. Violi, Lessici antropo-toponimici di Bova e Palizzi, UTE-TEL-B, Bova Marina, 2004.

See also
 List of Languages of Italy
 Sicilian language
 Calabria
 Magna Graecia
 Theme of Sicily

References

External links
 330 Calabrian verbs cross-referenced into English and Italian
 Calabrian phrasing (page in Italian)
 Storia e Folklore Calabrese (page in Italian)
 "Siciliano: Lingua o dialetto?" in Italian

 
Italo-Dalmatian languages
Extreme Southern Italian dialects
Articles containing video clips